Lake Peak is a mountain in Kosovo and northern North Macedonia, located in the Sharr Mountain range.

See also
 List of mountains in Kosovo

Notes and references

Notes:

References:

Šar Mountains
Two-thousanders of Kosovo
Two-thousanders of North Macedonia